Teodoro Clinio (1548 in Venice – April 1601 in Treviso) was an Italian composer.

Works
Passio secundum Joannem - recorded by Ensemble Triagonale, Michael Paumgarten, with German passion by Johannes Herold CPO, 2015

References

1548 births
1601 deaths